The 1978 United States Senate election in Mississippi was held on November 5, 1978. Incumbent Democratic U.S. Senator James Eastland decided to retire. Republican Thad Cochran won the open seat, becoming the first Republican to win a U.S. Senate election in Mississippi since Reconstruction.

Democratic primary

Candidates 
 Maurice Dantin, former District Attorney
 Cliff Finch, Governor of Mississippi
Robert L. Robinson
 Charles L. Sullivan, Lieutenant Governor of Mississippi
Richard C. Tedford
 Bill Waller, former Governor of Mississippi
Helen M. Williams

Results

Runoff results

Republican primary

Candidates 
 Thad Cochran, U.S. Representative from Jackson
 Charles W. Pickering, Chairman of the Mississippi Republican Party

Results

General election

Candidates

Thad Cochran, U.S. Representative from Jackson (Republican)
Maurice Dantin, former District Attorney (Democratic)
Charles Evers, Mayor of Fayette (Independent)
 Henry Jay Kirksey, civil rights activist and candidate for Governor in 1975 (Independent)

Campaign 
Evers was the first African American elected since the Reconstruction era to be mayor in any Mississippi city, in 1969. He ran as an independent, and as a result his campaign divided the Democrats and allowed Cochran to win the Senate seat with a 45 percent plurality. This made Cochran the first Republican in a century to win a statewide election (other than a presidential election) in Mississippi. Eastland resigned on December 27, 1978 to give Cochran a seniority advantage over new incoming senators.

Results

See also 
 1978 United States Senate elections

References 

Mississippi
1978
1978 Mississippi elections